In ethics, evasion is an act that deceives by stating a true statement that is irrelevant or leads to a false conclusion.  For instance, a man knows that another man is in a room in the building because he heard him, but in answer to a question, says, "I have not seen him," thereby avoiding lying and also avoiding making a revelation.

Evasion is described as a way to fulfill an obligation to tell the truth while keeping secrets from those not entitled to know the truth. Evasions are closely related to equivocations and mental reservations; indeed, some statements fall under both descriptions.

Question dodging
Question dodging is a rhetorical technique involving the intentional avoidance of answering a question. This may occur when the person questioned either does not know the answer and wants to avoid embarrassment, or when the person is being interrogated or questioned in debate, and wants to avoid giving a direct response.  
Overt question dodging can sometimes be employed humorously, in order to sidestep giving a public answer in a political discussion: when a reporter asked Mayor Richard J. Daley why Hubert Humphrey had lost the state of Illinois in the 1968 presidential election, Daley replied "He lost it because he didn't get enough votes." 
Similarly when Larry King asked Putin what happened with Kursk submarine, Putin answered: 'It sank'. 
Often the aim of dodging a question is to make it seem as though the question was fulfilled, leaving the person who asked the question feeling satisfied with the answer, unaware that the question was not properly answered. A false accusation of question dodging can sometimes be made as a disingenuous tactic in debate, in the informal fallacy of the loaded question. A common way out of this argument is not to answer the question (e.g. with a simple 'yes' or 'no'), but to challenge the assumption behind the question. This can lead the person questioned to be accused of "dodging the question".

In the context of political discourse, evasion is a technique of equivocation that is important for face management.

Evasion techniques
Peter Bull identified the following evasion techniques for answering questions:

 Ignoring the question
 Acknowledging the question without answering it
 Questioning the question by:
 requesting clarification
 reflecting the question back to the questioner, for example saying "you tell me"
 Attacking the question by saying:
 "the question fails to address the important issue"
 "the question is hypothetical or speculative"
 "the question is based on a false premise"
 "the question is factually inaccurate"
 "the question includes a misquotation"
 "the question includes a quotation taken out of context"
 "the question is objectionable"
 "the question is based on a false alternative"
 Attacking the questioner
 Declining to answer by:
 refusing on grounds of inability
 being unwilling to answer
 saying "I can't speak for someone else"
 deferring answer, saying "it is not possible to answer the question for the time being"
 pleading ignorance
 placing the responsibility to answer on someone else

See also
 Begging the question
 Mental reservation
 Non-apology apology
 Non-denial denial

References

Deception
Rhetorical techniques